Two ships of the United States Navy have been named USS McCook for Commander Roderick S. McCook (1839 – 1886).

United States Navy ship names